Edward James Toms (11 December 1899 – 2 January 1971) was a British athlete who competed mainly in the 1924 Summer Olympics.

Toms competed for Great Britain in the 1924 Summer Olympics held in Paris, France in the 4 x 400 metre relay where he won the bronze medal with his team mates George Renwick, Richard Ripley and Guy Butler. Toms also competed in the 400 metres event but was eliminated in the second round.

References

External links
 profile 

1899 births
1971 deaths
British male sprinters
Olympic athletes of Great Britain
Athletes (track and field) at the 1924 Summer Olympics
Olympic bronze medallists for Great Britain
Medalists at the 1924 Summer Olympics
Olympic bronze medalists in athletics (track and field)